Aoife Coughlan (born 13 October 1995) is an Australian judoka.

Coughlan was picked for the Tokyo 2020 Olympics where she competed in the women's 70 kg event. She won her first bout against Kinaua Biribo of Kiribati but then lost to Giovanna Scoccimaro of Germany and did not advance to the quarterfinals.

She is the bronze medallist of the 2021 Asian-Pacific Judo Championships in the -70 kg category.

References

External links
 
 

1995 births
Living people
Australian female judoka
Judoka at the 2020 Summer Olympics
Olympic judoka of Australia
Commonwealth Games gold medallists for Australia
Commonwealth Games medallists in judo
Judoka at the 2022 Commonwealth Games
21st-century Australian women
Medallists at the 2022 Commonwealth Games